Allen Town is a residential neighborhood  in the East End of  Freetown,  Sierra Leone. It is densely populated, with an ethnically  diverse population.

References

Neighbourhoods in Freetown
Populated coastal places in Sierra Leone
Western Area